Baijnath Kureel (1920-1984) was an Indian politician. He was elected from the Ramsanehighat in Uttar Pradesh to the Lower House of the Indian Parliament the Lok Sabha. He was a deputy minister in Power and Irrigation in the Union Government.

References

External links
  Official Biographical Sketch in Lok Sabha Website

1920 births
1984 deaths
Lok Sabha members from Uttar Pradesh
India MPs 1957–1962
India MPs 1962–1967
India MPs 1967–1970
India MPs 1971–1977
India MPs 1952–1957
People from Barabanki district